The 2020 Spa-Francorchamps FIA Formula 2 round was a pair of motor races for Formula 2 cars that took place on 29–30 August 2020 at the Circuit de Spa-Francorchamps in Stavelot, Belgium as part of the FIA Formula 2 Championship. It was the seventh round of the 2020 FIA Formula 2 Championship and ran in support of the 2020 Belgian Grand Prix.

Report
Yuki Tsunoda achieved his second pole, setting a time 0.128 seconds faster than Nikita Mazepin in qualifying. Mazepin crossed the finish line first in the race but he was handed a five second time penalty for forcing Tsunoda off the track multiple times. Mick Schumacher was the other person on the podium.

Shwartzman benefited from a good start and a collision between race leaders Dan Ticktum and Roy Nissany, reclaiming the championship lead from Ilott with the sprint race win. Schumacher returned to the podium, bringing Prema their first double on the finish of the sprint race. Guanyu Zhou completed the podium.

Classification

Qualifying

Feature race 

Note：
 – Nikita Mazepin originally finished first, but was given a five second penalty for forcing Yuki Tsunoda off track and was classified second.
 – Marcus Armstrong originally finished the race in thirteenth place, but was given a five second penalty after the race for leaving the track and gaining an advantage after passing Jack Aitken and was classified fifteenth.
 – Nobuharu Matsushita collided with Felipe Drugovich on the third lap and was given a three place grid penalty for the sprint race.
 – Felipe Drugovich originally finished the race in 20th place but was disqualified after pitting on the last lap, which violates Article 37.6 of the race rules, In addition, he started the sprint race from the back of the grid.

Sprint race 

Note  
 – Yuki Tsunoda originally finished in seventh place, but was given a five second time penalty for causing a collision.
 – Jack Aitken was given a ten second stop/go penalty after failing to start from the correct starting position.
 – Nobuharu Matsushita could not start the Sprint Race due to car damage sustained in the Feature Race after a collision with Felipe Drugovich.

Standings after the event

Drivers' Championship standings

Teams' Championship standings

 Note: Only the top five positions are included for both sets of standings.

See also 
2020 Belgian Grand Prix
2020 Spa-Francorchamps Formula 3 round

References

External links 
 

Spa
Auto races in Belgium
Spa-Francorchamps Formula 2 round